United Nations Security Council resolution 2092 was adopted in 2013.

See also
 List of United Nations Security Council Resolutions 2101 to 2200 (2013–2015)

References

External links
Text of the Resolution at undocs.org

2013 United Nations Security Council resolutions
February 2013 events